Hesse-Kassel may refer to:

 German states with Kassel as the capital:
 Landgraviate of Hesse-Kassel (1567–1803)
 Electorate of Hesse (1803–1807, 1814–1866)
 Kassel (region)
 Province of Kurhessen
 KSV Hessen Kassel
 Hessen Cassel, Indiana, a community in the United States